Roopkund (locally known as Mystery Lake or Skeleton Lake) is a high altitude glacial lake in the Uttarakhand state of India. It lies in the lap of Trishul massif. Roopkund is a popular trekking destination. The size of the lake varies substantially, but it is seldom more than 40 metres in diameter (1000 to 1500 square metres in area), and is frozen in the winter.

With a depth of about three metres, Roopkund is widely known for the hundreds of ancient human skeletons found at the edge of the lake. The human skeletal remains are visible at its bottom when the snow melts. Initial investigations led some to believe they were the remains of a semi-legendary event when a single group was killed in a sudden and violent hailstorm in the 9th century, but scientific research has subsequently shown that the remains belong to three distinct groups who died in two independent events; around 800 CE and 1800 CE respectively. Because of the human remains, the lake has been called "Skeleton Lake" in recent times.

Human skeletons

Skeletons were rediscovered in 1942 by a forest ranger of the Nanda Devi National Park, named Hari Kishan Madhwal. At first, British authorities feared that the skeletons represented casualties of a hidden Japanese invasion force, but it was found that the skeletons were far too old to be Japanese soldiers. The skeletons are visible in the clear water of the shallow lake during one month when the ice melts. Along with the skeletons, wooden artefacts, iron spearheads, leather slippers, and rings were also found. When a team from National Geographic retrieved about 30 skeletons in 2003, flesh was still attached to some of them.

	
Local legend says that the King of Kanauj, Raja Jasdhaval, with his pregnant wife, Rani Balampa, their servants, a dance troupe and others went on a pilgrimage to Nanda Devi shrine, and the group faced a storm with large hailstones, from which the entire party perished near Roopkund Lake.

Identification 
Remnants belonging to more than 300 people have been found. The Anthropological Survey of India conducted a study of the skeletons during the 1950s and some samples are displayed at the Anthropological Survey of India Museum, Dehradun. The studies of the skeletons revealed head injuries; according to some sources, these injuries were caused by round objects from above, and were the common cause of death amongst the deceased. Those researchers concluded that the victims had been caught in a sudden hailstorm, just as described in local legends and songs. Radiocarbon dating of the bones at Oxford University's Radiocarbon Accelerator Unit determined the time of death to be 850 CE ±30 years. More recently, radiocarbon dating combined with genome-wide analysis of 38 individuals from Roopkund Lake, found that the remains are from different eras and belong to three distinct groups. A group of 23 individuals (dated ~800 CE) had typical South Asian ancestry, one individual (dated ~1800 CE) had Southeast Asian ancestry, and 14 individuals (dated ~1800 CE) had ancestry typical of the eastern Mediterranean, and specifically of present-day people from mainland Greece and Crete. Those findings counter the theory that the individuals died in a single catastrophic event. The radiocarbon dating further suggests that the older, South Asian remains were deposited over an extended period of time, while the younger, eastern Mediterranean and Southeast Asian remains were deposited during a single event.

Conservation concerns
There is growing concern about the regular loss of skeletons and it is feared that, if steps are not taken to conserve them, the skeletons may gradually vanish in the years to come. It is reported that tourists visiting the area are in the habit of taking back the bones in large numbers and the district administration has expressed the need to protect the area. The district magistrate of Chamoli District has reported that tourists, trekkers, and curious researchers are transporting the skeletons on mules and recommended that the area should be protected. Government agencies have made efforts to develop the area as an eco-tourism destination to protect the skeletons.

Tourism

Roopkund is a picturesque tourist destination and one of the important places for trekking in Chamoli District, Himalayas, near the base of two Himalayan peaks: Trisul (7,120 m) and Nanda Ghunti (6,310 m). The Lake is flanked by a rock face named Junargali to the North and a peak named Chandania Kot to the East. A religious festival is held at the alpine meadow of Bedni Bugyal every autumn with nearby villages participating. A larger celebration, the Nanda Devi Raj Jat, takes place once every twelve years at Roopkund, during which Goddess Nanda is worshipped. The lake is covered with ice for most of the year, with the best time to trek being in autumn (mid-September to October).

In popular culture
Roopkund's skeletons were featured in a National Geographic documentary, "Riddles of the Dead: Skeleton Lake". The Indian Centre for Cellular and Molecular Biology (CCMB) commissioned the documentary "The Mysterious Frozen Lake in the Himalayas", where a scientific team and a film crew try to investigate the lake.

See also
 List of unsolved deaths

References

Further reading
 Aitken, Bill. The Nanda Devi Affair, Penguin Books India, 1994. .

External links

 
 Roopkund Trek, District Administration-Almora
 Roopkund Lake. Garhwali Traveller
 

Geography of Chamoli district
Glacial lakes of India
Lakes of Uttarakhand
Unsolved deaths
Hiking trails in Uttarakhand